Vanessa Olimpia Kaiser Barents-Von Hohenhagen (born 25 October 1977) is a Chilean columnist and politician serving as a councilwoman of Las Condes. She is the host of the Esfera Pública Youtube Channel and a political commentator with strong republican, democratic and libertarian tendencies.

Biography 
She has a Master of Arts in philosophy and a PhD in political sciences. 

She is the CEO of the Libertarian Centre of Studies of Chile ( CEL), and a columnist of El Líbero and El Mostrador. Her brothers are Axel Kaiser, a Chilean lawyer and author, and of Johannes Kaiser, a congressman and YouTuber. Kaiser has given at the Fundación para el Progreso (FPP), where she has denounced liberalism as the "true bailout [of society]".

She holds the Hannah Arendt chair of the Autonomous University of Chile.

She was elected as councilman of Las Condes in 2021.

On 18 October 2021, she was mentioned by Radio Bío-Bío as a possible minister of an eventual government of José Antonio Kast. She signed the Madrid Charter, a document drafted by the right Spanish party Vox that describes left-wing groups as enemies of Ibero-America involved in a "criminal project" that are "under the umbrella of the Cuban regime".

Works

Books
 «En vez de una sola mirada». Santiago, RIL Editorial, 2011.
 «Que no te rompan el corazón». Santiago, 2018.

Articles
 «Populismo en América Latina. Una revisión de la literatura y la agenda». Austral University Social Sciences Magazine. N°17. 2017.
 «La pluralidad humana en tanto conditio per quan de la vida política». Academy of Christian Humanism University Scholar Magazine. N°20. Vol. 85. 2015.
 «George Kateb, Dignidad Humana». Vol. 32. N°1. Harvard University Press, 2011.
 «El Neomercantilismo como modelo de mercado en Latinoamérica». Pléyade Magazine (Pontifical Catholic University of Chile). N°5. 2010.

References

External links
 

1978 births
Living people
Chilean people
Chilean people of German descent
Finis Terrae University alumni
University of Chile alumni
Pontifical Catholic University of Chile alumni
Chilean libertarians
Chilean anti-communists
Republican Party (Chile, 2019) politicians
Signers of the Madrid Charter
Municipal councillors of Las Condes